Bacillus pseudofirmus is a facultative anaerobe bacterium. It is a gram positive, alkaliphilic and alkalitolerant, aerobic endospore-forming bacteria.

In 2019, it was found in a hyperalkaline spring in Zambales (Philippines) a bacterial consortium of a strain of Bacillus pseudofirmus with Bacillus  agaradhaerens that can biodegrade LDPE plastic.

This species has been recently transferred into the genus Alkalihalobacillus.  The correct nomenclature is Alkalihalobacillus pseudofirmus.

See also
 Organisms breaking down plastic

References

Further reading

External links
UniProt entry
Type strain of Bacillus pseudofirmus at BacDive -  the Bacterial Diversity Metadatabase

pseudofirmus
Organisms breaking down plastic